A dinos is an ancient Greek mixing bowl or cauldron. It may also refer to:

People
 Dinos Angelidis (born 1969), Greek basketball player of mixed Greek-Austrian descent
 Dinos Chapman (born 1962), British visual artist, often known with his brother Jake as the Chapman Brothers
 Dinos Christianopoulos (1931–2020), Greek contemporary and post-war poet, novelist, folklorist, editor and researcher
 Dinos Dimopoulos (1921–2003), Greek actor, film director, screenwriter and theatre director
 Dinos Kouis (born 1955), Greek footballer
 Dinos Lefkaritis (born 1995), Cypriot alpine skier 
 Dinos Mitoglou (born 1996), Greek basketball player
 Dinos (rapper), stage name of French rapper Jules Jomby (born 1993)

Sports teams
 Calgary Dinos, the athletic teams that represent the University of Calgary in Calgary, Alberta, Canada
 Dinos Saltillo, an American football team based in Saltillo, Mexico
 Jeonbuk Dinos, original name of Jeonbuk Hyundai Motors, a professional football club based in Jeollabuk-do, South Korea
 NC Dinos, a South Korean baseball team
 Yulon Luxgen Dinos, a Taiwanese basketball team

See also
Dino (disambiguation)
Dinosaur
Dinos Painter, an Attic red-figure vase painter who was active during the second half of the 5th century BC 
Mr Dinos (foaled 14 April 1999), Irish-bred, British-trained Thoroughbred racehorse and sire 
Selena y Los Dinos, American Tejano band